Weavers Park, also known as United Park, and formerly O2 Park, Hunky Dorys Park and Head In The Game Park for sponsorship purposes, is a football stadium in Drogheda, Ireland. The ground has been home to League of Ireland side Drogheda United since 1979. It was officially opened on 12 August 1979 with a friendly against Queens Park Rangers F.C.

In October 1993, the first match under floodlights took place with a 2-1 win over Shamrock Rovers

The ground has a capacity of 3,500 with 1,500 seats. During the middle of 2010, renovations took place to bring the venue up to licensing standards: changes include the addition of seats to the GAA side of the ground (to bring the seating capacity up to 1,500), new toilet facilities and a new covered section dedicated to wheelchair users.

The ground was also known briefly as O2 Park during 2002 and 2003, as part of a sponsorship deal with the telecommunications company O2. The stadium used to hold 5,400, though the safe capacity is now set at 2000 by the Louth County Fire Officer.

The stadium has also hosted five Republic of Ireland under-21 national football team games and other international underage games including games in the 1994 UEFA European Under-16 Football Championship. Proposals were made to sell the site and build a 10,000 all seater new stadium on the outskirts of the town. In July 2008, planning permission was given to Drogheda United by Meath County Council, however, the plans eventually fell through.

References

Drogheda United F.C.
Association football venues in the Republic of Ireland
Multi-purpose stadiums in the Republic of Ireland
Sports venues in County Louth
Association football clubs established in 1979
1979 establishments in Ireland